FK Radnički Nova Pazova is a football club based in Nova Pazova, Vojvodina, Serbia. They compete in the Vojvodina League South, the fourth tier of the national league system.

History
After spending nine seasons in the Serbian League Vojvodina, the club finished as champions in the 2011–12 season and earned promotion to the Serbian First League. They were relegated back to the third tier after just one season. In November 2016, the club marked its 70th anniversary.

Honours
Serbian League Vojvodina (Tier 3)
 2011–12

Seasons

Managerial history

References

External links
 Club page at Srbijasport

 
1946 establishments in Serbia
Association football clubs established in 1946
Football clubs in Vojvodina
Football clubs in Serbia